Eltio Alegondas Forsten (12 July 1811, Middelburg – 1843, Ambon Island) was a Dutch naturalist.

He studied medicine at Leiden, obtaining his degree in 1836 with a thesis on Cedrela febrifuga, titled "Dissertatio botanico-pharmaceutico-medica inauguralis de cedrela febrifuga". In 1838 he became a member of the Natuurkundige Commissie for the Dutch East Indies, where he would spend the next several years collecting zoological and botanical specimens (Java, Sulawesi, Ternate, Ambon).

Eponymy (birds and reptiles) 
 Forsten's cat snake, Boiga forsteni.
 Forsten's lorikeet, Trichoglossus forsteni.
 Forsten's megapode, Megapodius freycinet.
 Forsten's pointed snake, Rabdion forsteni.
 Forsten's tortoise, Indotestudo forstenii.
 Purple-bearded bee-eater, Meropogon forsteni.

References 

1811 births
1843 deaths
People from Middelburg, Zeeland
Dutch naturalists